Lina Mittner (10 February 1919 – 25 February 2013) was a Swiss alpine skier who competed in the 1948 Winter Olympics.

References

1919 births
2013 deaths
Swiss female alpine skiers
Olympic alpine skiers of Switzerland
Alpine skiers at the 1948 Winter Olympics